The 2001 Southeast Asian Games, officially known as the 21st Southeast Asian Games, was a Southeast Asian multi-sport event held in Kuala Lumpur, Malaysia. This was the fifth time that Malaysia plays as SEA Games hosts, the country previously held the event in 1965, 1971, 1977, and 1989, all of which were staged in Kuala Lumpur.

Held from 8 to 17 September 2001 (although several events had commenced from 1 September 2001), these were the first SEA Games to have taken place in the new millennium. Around 4,165 athletes have participated at the Kuala Lumpur Games, which featured 391 events in 32 sports. It was opened by Salahuddin, the King of Malaysia at the Bukit Jalil National Stadium.

The final medal tally was led by host Malaysia, followed by Thailand and Indonesia. Several Games and National Records were broken during the games. The games were deemed generally successful with the rising standard of competition amongst the Southeast Asian nations.

Development and preparation
The Kuala Lumpur 21st SEA Games Organizing Committee (KULSOC) was formed to oversee the staging of the event.

Venues
The 2001 Southeast Asian Games used a mix of new, existing and temporary venues. Most venues were pre-existing public-sporting facilities which were reverted to public use after the games. No major retrofitting work were done in most venues as most had been used to host major multi-disciplinary events such as the 1998 Commonwealth Games.

At the centrepiece of the activities was the Bukit Jalil National Sports Complex. Incorporating the new 87,411-seat national stadium, it hosted most of the events.

A games village was not built. Instead, a "village in the city" concept saw athletes and officials housed in hotels across Peninsular Malaysia. Besides being physically near to the sport venues, it was hoped that it will add vibe to all the states and reduce post-games costs in converting a dedicated games village to other uses.

The 21st Southeast Asian Games had 39 venues for the games. 19 in Kuala Lumpur, 10 in Selangor, 4 in Johor and 3 each in Negeri Sembilan and Penang respectively.

Torch relay

The 21st SEA Games torch relay ran from 10 March 2001 to 8 September 2001, covering a distance of 7,884 km. The run began in Labuan followed by Sabah and Sarawak. In the peninsula, it started in Langkawi and passed through 12 states before it ended in Kuala Lumpur. The last leg of the run covered approximately 15 km, from Merdeka Square to Bukit Jalil National Stadium.

Marketing

Logo and mascot
 
The official logo for the games is an interpretation of a flame. In stylising the "flame" for the logo's design, its tongues have been individually separated and simplified. The logo's weaving formation conveys unity, and a coming together of Southeast Asia's best athletes. Its "weaving" also gives an opportunity to form the Roman numeral XXI, representing the 21st century, as well as having the Kuala Lumpur Games being the 21st edition of the SEA Games.

The mascot of the 2001 SEA Games is a squirrel named Si Tumas, a short form for Tupai Emas (Golden squirrel). In addition, the Si is phonetically similar to SEA as in SEA Games, and it is also a friendly form of address in Malay.

Songs
The theme song of the games is "In Glory We Celebrate (The SEA Games - 2001)", composed by Helen Yap from Magic Nova Productions with lyrics written in English by Tom Leng and lyrics written in Malay by Loloq, and was sung by Lynn Ali. A campaign song of the games was composed by Jaafar Abdul Rahman Idris with lyrics written by Dato Mokhzani Ismail and was sung by Adibah Noor.

Sponsors
A total of 26 sponsors, comprising 4 Official Partners, 8 Main Sponsors and 14 Official Sponsors sponsored the games.

Official partners
 Petronas
 Telekom Malaysia
 Tenaga Nasional
 PROTON Holdings
Main sponsors
 Antioni
 Milo
 Coca-Cola

Main sponsors (continue)
 Spritzer
 Genting Group
 Bata Shoes
 Syarikat Supreme Landmark & Wireless Corp. Sdn. Berhad
 Galaxy Automation Sdn. Berhad
Official sponsors
 Fraser and Neave
 Nestlé Cereals

Official sponsors (continue)
 Lion Corporation
 Nikon
 Kodak
 Asia Pacific Sports
 Mesuma Sports Sdn Bhd
 FBT
 Royal Selangor 

Official sponsors (continue)
 Siemens
 Fujitsu
 Stanson
 Consolidated Farms 
 Malaysia Airlines

The games

Closing ceremony

The closing ceremony took place on 17 September 2001 in a rainy night with the theme: ASEAN, a time to celebrate (ASEAN: Masa untuk merayakan). It was attended by 100,000 audiences who managed to get into the stadium and take their seats. The ceremony begins with the performance of local celebrities including Erra Fazira and Ziana Zain.

After that, a group of paratroopers descended on the field of the stadium with the flags of the 10 participating nations of the games accompanied with the song "Jalur Gemilang" performed by a choir group. The athletes of the participating nations then paraded into the stadium by order of sports competed at the games and received warm welcome by the audience in the stadium. The order began with the aquatics, followed by archery, athletics and other sports.  
    
The ceremony then continues with the performance of "Citrawarna Malaysia', performed by 300 dancers and 50 drum players that rocks the stadium with the rhythmic beat that reflects the diversity of the song rhythm and the traditional dances of the multi-racial society in Malaysia. Later, Mohd Qabil Ambak Mahamad Fathil, the Malaysian Equestrian rider was declared the Best Sportsman of the games, while the Thai Athletics sprinter Supavadee Khawpeag was declared the Best Sportswoman of the games.

After Prime minister Mahathir Mohammad declared the games closed, the Southeast Asian Games Federation flag was lowered and the flame of the cauldron was extinguished. The president of the Southeast Asian Games Federation and the president of the Olympic Council of Malaysia, Tan Sri Tunku Muda Serting Imran then handed over the games flag and the baton to the president of the Vietnam Olympic Committee and the Minister of Sports, Nguyen Danh Thai, a symbol of the SEA Games responsibilities being officially handed over to Vietnam, host of the 2003 Southeast Asian Games. The national anthem of Vietnam was played as the National Flag of Vietnam was raised. After that, an 11-minute Vietnam segment performance titled "Welcome to Vietnam" was performed by Vietnamese female dancers carrying a giant red flag with them. The performance was divided into three parts. The ceremony concludes with a Malaysian farewell segment performance in which the firework simultaneously released into the sky with 21 mountaineers fall from the roof using the ropes attached to them and distribute gifts to some lucky audiences while the balloons and colourful papers were spread into the air. A special concert was then held by popular artistes like Siti Nurhaliza, Erra Fazira, Sheila Majid and Amy of Search.

Participating nations

 
 
 
 
  (Host)

Sports

 Aquatics

Calendar

Medal table
A total of 1280 medals comprising 392 gold medals, 390 silver medals and 498 bronze medals were awarded to athletes. The Host Malaysia's performance was their best ever yet in Southeast Asian Games History and emerged as overall champion of the games.

Key

See also
 2001 ASEAN Para Games

References

External links
 
 Unofficial games site
 Utusan Malaysia Special Coverage Page on the games

 
Southeast Asian Games
Southeast Asian Games
Southeast Asian Games
International sports competitions hosted by Malaysia
Sport in Kuala Lumpur
Southeast Asian Games
Multi-sport events in Malaysia
2000s in Kuala Lumpur